"Boss's Daughter" is the eighth single from Pop Evil, and the third single from War of Angels.  Directed by Nathan Cox, the video was released on May 25, 2012 with Jessa Hinton and Mick Mars starring in the shoot.

Premise
According to lead vocalist Leigh Kakaty the music video was designed to convey the raw explosiveness and ambiance of one of the band's shows.  Kakaty goes on to say that:
"This video for 'Boss's Daughter' captured everything we think of ourselves as a rock band– just in-your-face and a lot of red, white and blue.  It's about all-American rock band pride, beautiful women and rock stars rocking."

Charts

Weekly charts

Year-end charts

References

2012 singles
Pop Evil songs
2011 songs
Songs written by Dave Bassett (songwriter)
Songs written by Mick Mars
Song recordings produced by Johnny K
MNRK Music Group singles